Bala Deh (also Romanized as Bālā Deh; also known as Sekīnābād) is a village in Asalem Rural District, Asalem District, Talesh County, Gilan Province, Iran. At the 2006 census, its population was 2,379, in 524 families.

References 

Populated places in Talesh County